Judith Sans Serra (born 31 March 1994) is a Spanish handball player  for BM Bera Bera and the Spanish national team.

She was part of the  team at the 2016 European Women's Handball Championship.

References

1994 births
Living people
Spanish female handball players
People from Ribera d'Ebre
Sportspeople from the Province of Tarragona
Handball players from Catalonia
Expatriate handball players
Spanish expatriate sportspeople in Denmark
Competitors at the 2018 Mediterranean Games
Mediterranean Games gold medalists for Spain
Mediterranean Games medalists in handball
21st-century Spanish women